Balagan-Tas is a cinder cone volcano in Russia. It was discovered by V.A. Zimin in 1939 and is one of the main features of the Moma Natural Park.

Description
This volcano is located in the Chersky Range, in the Moma River valley and is the only clearly Quaternary volcano in the area; the existence of another volcano active in the 1770s has not been confirmed. The supposed Indighirsky volcano may be actually Balagan-Tas. Its location has often been given incorrectly.

Balagan-Tas is a volcanic cone with a crater of which little remains. It may be considered a composite volcano.

The volcano has erupted alkali basalts typical for rift zone volcanoes. Its composition has been characterized as hawaiite. Titanium dioxide contents of 3.81% have been measured. The helium-3/helium-4 ratios approach these associated with mantle plumes.

Balagan-Tas lies on an anticline. It is associated with faulting. Further it is related to the Moma-Zoryansk rift and the Gakkel ridge, which extends to the Laptev sea. The De Long Islands and a potentially Quaternary dyke complex of the Viliga river may also be related. This tectonic activity is related to the interaction between the Eurasian Plate and the North American Plate.

Other volcanoes are found in the neighbourhood. Its age is unclear, potassium-argon dating has yielded an age of 16.6 mya but its appearance indicates it may be considerably younger. A further volcano may exist northwest of this centre.

Potassium-argon dating of Balagan-Tas has yielded an age of 266,000 ± 30,000 years ago, comparable to Anyuj volcano. Other sources consider the volcano late Holocene in age, or even as active during historical time. Hot springs are found southeast of Balagan-Tas. If reports of activity of the supposed Indighirsky volcano in the 1770s refer to Balagan-Tas, this volcano may have had historical activity, one of the few outside of Kamchatka in continental Asia.

References

Sources

Further reading 
 Argunov, M. S., and S. I. Gavrikov. "Balagan-Tas, an early Quaternary volcano." Izv. Acad. Sci. USSR 8 (1960): 72–74.
 Global Volcanism Program, 2013. Balagan-Tas (301805) in Volcanoes of the World, v. 4.5.0. Venzke, E (ed.). Smithsonian Institution. Downloaded 24 Sep 2016 (http://volcano.si.edu/volcano.cfm?vn=301805). https://dx.doi.org/10.5479/si.GVP.VOTW4-2013 
 Rudich, K. N. "Late Quaternary volcano Balagan-Tas." Presentday Volcanism in Northeast Siberia, edited by: Rudich, KN, Nauka, Moscow (1964): 3-44.

Pleistocene volcanoes
Holocene volcanoes
Volcanoes of Russia
Geology of Russia
Chersky Range